Thallous malonate is a chemical compound composed mainly of Thallium.  It is an extremely hazardous substance and is on the List of extremely hazardous substances.

References 

Malonates
Thallium(I) compounds